Petrushino is a rural locality (a village) in Yesiplevskoye Rural Settlement, Kolchuginsky District, Vladimir Oblast, Russia. The population was 1 as of 2010.

Geography 
Petrushino is located on the Tsiminka River, 22 km east of Kolchugino (the district's administrative centre) by road. Novobusino is the nearest rural locality.

References 

Rural localities in Kolchuginsky District